Voskresensky (masculine), Voskresenskaya (feminine), or Voskresenskoye (neuter) is the name of several inhabited localities in Russia.

Republic of Bashkortostan
As of 2010, three rural localities in the Republic of Bashkortostan bear this name:
Voskresenskoye, Kugarchinsky District, Republic of Bashkortostan, a village in Zarechensky Selsoviet of Kugarchinsky District
Voskresenskoye, Meleuzovsky District, Republic of Bashkortostan, a selo in Voskresensky Selsoviet of Meleuzovsky District
Voskresenskoye, Zilairsky District, Republic of Bashkortostan, a selo in Yuldybayevsky Selsoviet of Zilairsky District

Bryansk Oblast
As of 2010, one rural locality in Bryansk Oblast bears this name:
Voskresensky, Bryansk Oblast, a settlement in Mylinsky Selsoviet of Karachevsky District

Chelyabinsk Oblast
As of 2010, one rural locality in Chelyabinsk Oblast bears this name:
Voskresenskoye, Chelyabinsk Oblast, a selo in Tyubuksky Selsoviet of Kaslinsky District

Ivanovo Oblast
As of 2010, five rural localities in Ivanovo Oblast bear this name:
Voskresenskoye, Ilyinsky District, Ivanovo Oblast, a selo in Ilyinsky District
Voskresenskoye, Kineshemsky District, Ivanovo Oblast, a selo in Kineshemsky District
Voskresenskoye, Lezhnevsky District, Ivanovo Oblast, a selo in Lezhnevsky District
Voskresenskoye, Rodnikovsky District, Ivanovo Oblast, a village in Rodnikovsky District
Voskresenskoye, Savinsky District, Ivanovo Oblast, a selo in Savinsky District

Kaliningrad Oblast
As of 2010, one rural locality in Kaliningrad Oblast bears this name:
Voskresenskoye, Kaliningrad Oblast, a settlement in Prigorodny Rural Okrug of Nesterovsky District

Kaluga Oblast
As of 2010, one rural locality in Kaluga Oblast bears this name:
Voskresenskoye, Kaluga Oblast, a selo in Ferzikovsky District

Khabarovsk Krai
As of 2010, one rural locality in Khabarovsk Krai bears this name:
Voskresenskoye, Khabarovsk Krai, a selo in Ulchsky District

Kostroma Oblast
As of 2010, four rural localities in Kostroma Oblast bear this name:
Voskresenskoye, Antropovsky District, Kostroma Oblast, a village in Kotelnikovskoye Settlement of Antropovsky District
Voskresenskoye, Galichsky District, Kostroma Oblast, a selo in Orekhovskoye Settlement of Galichsky District
Voskresenskoye, Nerekhtsky District, Kostroma Oblast, a selo in Voskresenskoye Settlement of Nerekhtsky District
Voskresenskoye, Ostrovsky District, Kostroma Oblast, a selo in Klevantsovskoye Settlement of Ostrovsky District

Kurgan Oblast
As of 2010, one rural locality in Kurgan Oblast bears this name:
Voskresenskoye, Kurgan Oblast, a village in Voskresensky Selsoviet of Polovinsky District

Leningrad Oblast
As of 2010, two rural localities in Leningrad Oblast bear this name:
Voskresenskoye, Gatchinsky District, Leningrad Oblast, a slobodka in Kobrinskoye Settlement Municipal Formation of Gatchinsky District
Voskresenskoye, Volkhovsky District, Leningrad Oblast, a village in Khvalovskoye Settlement Municipal Formation of Volkhovsky District

Lipetsk Oblast
As of 2010, three rural localities in Lipetsk Oblast bear this name:
Voskresenskoye, Chaplyginsky District, Lipetsk Oblast, a village in Bratovsky Selsoviet of Chaplyginsky District
Voskresenskoye, Oktyabrsky Selsoviet, Dankovsky District, Lipetsk Oblast, a selo in Oktyabrsky Selsoviet of Dankovsky District
Voskresenskoye, Voskresensky Selsoviet, Dankovsky District, Lipetsk Oblast, a selo in Voskresensky Selsoviet of Dankovsky District

Mari El Republic
As of 2010, two rural localities in the Mari El Republic bear this name:
Voskresensky, Mari El Republic, a khutor in Bolsheparatsky Rural Okrug of Volzhsky District
Voskresenskoye, Mari El Republic, a village in Kuzhmarinsky Rural Okrug of Sovetsky District

Moscow Oblast
As of 2010, five rural localities in Moscow Oblast bear this name:
Voskresenskoye, Kashirsky District, Moscow Oblast, a village in Znamenskoye Rural Settlement of Kashirsky District
Voskresenskoye, Noginsky District, Moscow Oblast, a selo in Yamkinskoye Rural Settlement of Noginsky District
Voskresenskoye, Ramensky District, Moscow Oblast, a selo in Konstantinovskoye Rural Settlement of Ramensky District
Voskresenskoye, Ruzsky District, Moscow Oblast, a village in Staroruzskoye Rural Settlement of Ruzsky District
Voskresenskoye, Shakhovskoy District, Moscow Oblast, a village in Ramenskoye Rural Settlement of Shakhovskoy District

Nizhny Novgorod Oblast
As of 2010, three inhabited localities in Nizhny Novgorod Oblast bear this name:
Voskresenskoye, Voskresensky District, Nizhny Novgorod Oblast, an urban locality (a work settlement) in Voskresensky District
Voskresenskoye, Sergachsky District, Nizhny Novgorod Oblast, a rural locality (a selo) in Andreyevsky Selsoviet of Sergachsky District
Voskresenskoye, Tonshayevsky District, Nizhny Novgorod Oblast, a rural locality (a village) in Berezyatsky Selsoviet of Tonshayevsky District

Novgorod Oblast
As of 2010, two rural localities in Novgorod Oblast bear this name:
Voskresenskoye, Maryovsky District, Novgorod Oblast, a village in Molvotitskoye Settlement of Maryovsky District
Voskresenskoye, Pestovsky District, Novgorod Oblast, a village in Bykovskoye Settlement of Pestovsky District

Oryol Oblast
As of 2010, three rural localities in Oryol Oblast bear this name:
Voskresensky, Bolkhovsky District, Oryol Oblast, a settlement in Borovskoy Selsoviet of Bolkhovsky District
Voskresensky, Dmitrovsky District, Oryol Oblast, a settlement in Domakhovsky Selsoviet of Dmitrovsky District
Voskresensky, Kromskoy District, Oryol Oblast, a settlement in Retyazhsky Selsoviet of Kromskoy District

Perm Krai
As of 2010, two rural localities in Perm Krai bear this name:
Voskresenskoye, Perm Krai, a selo in Uinsky District
Voskresenskaya, Perm Krai, a village in Sivinsky District

Pskov Oblast
As of 2010, three rural localities in Pskov Oblast bear this name:
Voskresenskoye, Gdovsky District, Pskov Oblast, a village in Gdovsky District
Voskresenskoye, Pskovsky District, Pskov Oblast, a village in Pskovsky District
Voskresenskoye, Pushkinogorsky District, Pskov Oblast, a village in Pushkinogorsky District

Saratov Oblast
As of 2010, one rural locality in Saratov Oblast bears this name:
Voskresenskoye, Saratov Oblast, a selo in Voskresensky District

Stavropol Krai
As of 2010, one rural locality in Stavropol Krai bears this name:
Voskresenskaya, Stavropol Krai, a stanitsa in Novoalexandrovsky District

Republic of Tatarstan
As of 2010, one rural locality in the Republic of Tatarstan bears this name:
Voskresensky, Republic of Tatarstan, a settlement in Kaybitsky District

Tver Oblast
As of 2010, eight rural localities in Tver Oblast bear this name:
Voskresenskoye, Andreapolsky District, Tver Oblast, a selo in Andreapolsky District
Voskresenskoye, Kalininsky District, Tver Oblast, a village in Kalininsky District
Voskresenskoye, Kalyazinsky District, Tver Oblast, a village in Kalyazinsky District
Voskresenskoye, Likhoslavlsky District, Tver Oblast, a village in Likhoslavlsky District
Voskresenskoye, Molokovsky District, Tver Oblast, a village in Molokovsky District
Voskresenskoye, Sonkovsky District, Tver Oblast, a village in Sonkovsky District
Voskresenskoye, Zubtsovsky District, Tver Oblast, two villages in Zubtsovsky District

Vladimir Oblast
As of 2010, four rural localities in Vladimir Oblast bear this name:
Voskresenskoye, Alexandrovsky District, Vladimir Oblast, a village in Alexandrovsky District
Voskresenskoye, Kameshkovsky District, Vladimir Oblast, a selo in Kameshkovsky District
Voskresenskoye, Kolchuginsky District, Vladimir Oblast, a selo in Kolchuginsky District
Voskresenskoye, Yuryev-Polsky District, Vladimir Oblast, a village in Yuryev-Polsky District

Vologda Oblast
As of 2010, seven rural localities in Vologda Oblast bear this name:
Voskresenskoye, Babushkinsky District, Vologda Oblast, a selo in Bereznikovsky Selsoviet of Babushkinsky District
Voskresenskoye, Musorsky Selsoviet, Cherepovetsky District, Vologda Oblast, a selo in Musorsky Selsoviet of Cherepovetsky District
Voskresenskoye, Voskresensky Selsoviet, Cherepovetsky District, Vologda Oblast, a selo in Voskresensky Selsoviet of Cherepovetsky District
Voskresenskoye, Gryazovetsky District, Vologda Oblast, a selo in Vederkovsky Selsoviet of Gryazovetsky District
Voskresenskoye, Borisovsky Selsoviet, Vologodsky District, Vologda Oblast, a village in Borisovsky Selsoviet of Vologodsky District
Voskresenskoye, Sosnovsky Selsoviet, Vologodsky District, Vologda Oblast, a village in Sosnovsky Selsoviet of Vologodsky District
Voskresenskoye, Vozhegodsky District, Vologda Oblast, a selo in Punemsky Selsoviet of Vozhegodsky District

Voronezh Oblast
As of 2010, one rural locality in Voronezh Oblast bears this name:
Voskresensky, Voronezh Oblast, a settlement in Voznesenovskoye Rural Settlement of Talovsky District

Yaroslavl Oblast
As of 2010, eight rural localities in Yaroslavl Oblast bear this name:
Voskresenskoye, Lyubimsky District, Yaroslavl Oblast, a selo in Voskresensky Rural Okrug of Lyubimsky District
Voskresenskoye, Myshkinsky District, Yaroslavl Oblast, a selo in Rozhdestvensky Rural Okrug of Myshkinsky District
Voskresenskoye, Latskovsky Rural Okrug, Nekouzsky District, Yaroslavl Oblast, a selo in Latskovsky Rural Okrug of Nekouzsky District
Voskresenskoye, Rodionovsky Rural Okrug, Nekouzsky District, Yaroslavl Oblast, a selo in Rodionovsky Rural Okrug of Nekouzsky District
Voskresenskoye, Pereslavsky District, Yaroslavl Oblast, a village in Glebovsky Rural Okrug of Pereslavsky District
Voskresenskoye, Poshekhonsky District, Yaroslavl Oblast, a selo in Vasilyevsky Rural Okrug of Poshekhonsky District
Voskresenskoye, Ilyinsky Rural Okrug, Uglichsky District, Yaroslavl Oblast, a selo in Ilyinsky Rural Okrug of Uglichsky District
Voskresenskoye, Ninorovsky Rural Okrug, Uglichsky District, Yaroslavl Oblast, a village in Ninorovsky Rural Okrug of Uglichsky District